Jerome Bunty Chaffee (April 17, 1825 – March 9, 1886) was an American entrepreneur and United States Senator from Colorado. Chaffee County, Colorado is named after him.

Biography
He was born in Cambria, New York. He moved to Adrian, Michigan in 1844 and worked as a teacher until starting a dry goods business in the late 1840s. In 1852 he moved to St. Joseph, Missouri, and later to Elmwood, Kansas Territory where he started banking businesses and engaged in land speculation.

In 1860 he moved to Colorado to invest in mining. He was one of the founders of the City of Denver, Colorado, and founded the First National Bank of Denver in 1865. Chaffee entered politics and helped organize the Colorado Territory, serving in its first legislature as speaker. He was the territorial delegate to the United States Congress starting in 1870.

In 1876, after Colorado was admitted to the Union, Chaffee was elected to the United States Senate. He served for the duration of his term, until 1879, but did not seek reelection due to poor health.

In 1884, Chaffee was elected state chairman of the Colorado Republican Party.

His sole surviving child, daughter Fannie Josephine (1857–1909), married Ulysses S. Grant, Jr., a son of U.S. President Ulysses S. Grant. The couple had five children, including Ulysses S. Grant IV.

Chaffee died March 9, 1886, at the Grants' home in Salem Center, New York. He is buried in Adrian Cemetery, in Adrian, Michigan.

Notes

References
 Biographical Directory of the United States Congress: Chaffee, Jerome Bunty, accessed 9 December 2005
 The National Cyclopædia of American Biography. (1929) Vol. VI New York: James T. White & Co. pp. 199–200.
 Who was Who in America, Historical Volume. (1963) Chicago: Marquis Who's Who

1825 births
1886 deaths
Members of the Colorado Territorial Legislature
Delegates to the United States House of Representatives from Colorado Territory
People from Niagara County, New York
People from Adrian, Michigan
Colorado Republican Party chairs
Republican Party United States senators from Colorado
Republican Party members of the United States House of Representatives from Colorado
19th-century American politicians